Central Radio or Central FM may refer to:

 106.5 Central Radio, a commercial DAB radio station in Lancashire, England
 Central 103.1 FM, a radio station serving Falkirk, Stirling and Clackmannanshire, Scotland
 93.3 Central FM, a former radio station based in Malta
 Central FM (Spanish radio station), an English radio station broadcasting in Southern Spain